Ships named Winfield Scott have been:

, a sidewheel steamer that transported passengers and cargo between San Francisco, California and Panama in the early 1850s.
, a US Army tugboat currently laid-up.
, a Liberty ship

Ship names